Deft may refer to:
Deft (gamer) (born 1996), League of Legends player
USS Deft (AM-216), an Admirable-class minesweeper
Deft (company)

Distinguish from
Delft